Street Symphony may refer to:

Street Symphony (producer), American music producer
"Street Symphony" (song), 1999 song by Monica